Ahmad Jaber Ali H. Zanki (born 17 December 1995) is a Kuwaiti footballer who plays as a winger for Al Kuwait and the Kuwait national football team.

Career

International
Zanki made his senior international debut on 19 November 2019, coming on as a 66th minute substitute for Faisal Zayid in a 1-0 away victory over Nepal during World Cup qualifying. He scored his first senior international goal in his subsequent cap, netting in the 85th minute of a 4-2 defeat to Bahrain at the 24th Arabian Gulf Cup.

International goals
Scores and results list Kuwait's goal tally first.

Career statistics

International

References

External links

1995 births
Living people
Qadsia SC players
Al-Shabab SC (Kuwait) players
Kuwait Premier League players
Kuwaiti footballers
Kuwait international footballers
Association football midfielders
Kuwait SC players